The 2019 Prairie View A&M Panthers football team represents Prairie View A&M University in the 2019 NCAA Division I FCS football season. The Panthers are led by second-year head coach Eric Dooley and play their home games at Panther Stadium at Blackshear Field in Prairie View, Texas as members of the West Division of the Southwestern Athletic Conference (SWAC).

Previous season

The Panthers finished the 2018 season 5–6, 4–3 in SWAC play to finish in a tie for second place in the West Division.

Preseason

Preseason polls
The SWAC released their preseason poll on July 16, 2019. The Panthers were picked to finish in second place in the West Division.

Preseason all–SWAC teams
The Tigers placed eight players on the preseason all–SWAC teams.

Offense

1st team

DeJohn Jones – OL

Tristen Wallace – WR

2nd team

Dawonya Tucker – RB

Christian Rice – OL

Danny Garza – OL

Defense

1st team

Ju'Anthony Parker – DB

2nd team

Ron Collins – DL

Specialists

2nd team

Zack Elder – K

Schedule

Game summaries

at Texas Southern

at Houston

Nicholls

at Alcorn State

vs. Grambling State

at Southern

Virginia–Lynchburg

Jackson State

Arkansas–Pine Bluff

Edward Waters

at Alabama State

References

Prairie View AandM
Prairie View A&M Panthers football seasons
Prairie View AandM football